A music streaming service is a type of streaming media service that focuses primarily on music, and sometimes other forms of digital audio content such as podcasts. These services are usually subscription-based services allowing users to stream digital copyright restricted songs on-demand from a centralized library provided by the service. Some services may offer free tiers with limitations, such as advertising and limits on use. They typically incorporate a recommendation engine to help users discover other songs they may enjoy based on their listening history and other factors, as well as the ability to create and share public playlists with other users.

Streaming services saw a significant pace of growth in the mid-2010s, overtaking music stores as the largest revenue stream of digital music. Streaming services, along with streams of music-related content on video sharing platforms, were incorporated into the methodologies of major record charts. The "album-equivalent unit" was also developed as an alternative metric for the consumption of albums, to account for digital music and streaming.

History 
Digital distribution of music began to achieve prominence in the late-1990s and early-2000's; MP3.com and PeopleSound were the first two platforms, and early forerunners to platforms such as Spotify and Apple Music, offering the ability for musicians (including, especially, independent musicians) to upload and distribute their songs online in the MP3 format. MP3.com later offered a service known as My.MP3.com, allowing users to rip and upload music from CDs they owned into a personal library they could stream via their accounts. The service was the subject of a lawsuit by Universal Music Group, which ruled that the service constituted the unauthorized distribution of their copyrighted music recordings. The lawsuit proved detrimental to the company; it was subsequently acquired by UMG's parent company Vivendi Universal, and later sold to CNET (which shut down its music distribution platform).

Pandora Radio launched in 2005; the service initially allowed users to create and listen to internet radio stations based on categories such as genres, which could then be personalized by giving "thumbs up" and "thumbs down" ratings to songs and artists the user liked or disliked. The service's recommendation engine, the Music Genome Project, analyzes and determines songs based on various traits. As Pandora initially operated within the royalty framework enforced by SoundExchange for internet radio in the United States, the service did not allow users to freely choose songs to play on-demand, and users could only skip a limited number of songs per-hour (although users could later receive more skips by watching video advertisements).

The social networking service MySpace, and later the video sharing platform YouTube, also became prominent outlets for streaming music, with the latter becoming particularly prominent for music videos. In 2006, Swedish businessman Daniel Ek and Martin Lorentzon founded Spotify, which first launched in 2008; aiming to create a legal alternative to file sharing platforms such as Napster and Kazaa, the service allowed users to stream songs on-demand using peer-to-peer technology, and would be offered in subscription-based and ad-supported tiers. Ek stated that he wanted to "create a service that was better than piracy and at the same time compensates the music industry." In 2006, a French music streaming website known as Blogmusiq was shut down after copyright complaints by the local royalty agency SACEM. After reaching agreements with SACEM, the site subsequently relaunched as Deezer, which reached seven million users by the end of 2009. 

By the early-2010's, online streaming had begun to displace radio airplay as a significant factor in the commercial success of music. Spotify officially launched in the United States in 2011, and in March 2012, Billboard added streaming services to the formula of its Hot 100 chart. Later that year, Psy's K-pop song "Gangnam Style" became a major international hit, driven primarily by the popularity of its music video—which later became the first YouTube video to reach one billion views.  

After Spotify's launch, competing services began to emerge in the North American market, including Beats Music—which was backed by headphone maker Beats Electronics, Microsoft Groove Music Pass (formerly Xbox Music), Amazon Music Unlimited, and Google Play Music All-Access (a branch of a service also offering downloads and a music locker). Beats Electronics was later acquired by Apple Inc., which discontinued Beats Music in 2015 and replaced it with a new Apple Music service. Tidal, a streaming service oriented towards high-fidelity audio, also emerged in 2015, with backing from rapper Jay-Z, and a focus on exclusive content. 

In October 2015, after initially offering a subscription bundling Play Music All Access with ad-free viewing of music content on YouTube, Google launched YouTube Red— which extended ad-free access to all videos on the platform, and added premium original video content in an effort to compete with services such as Netflix. Concurrently, YouTube introduced YouTube Music, an app dedicated to music content on the platform. In 2017, Pandora launched a Premium tier, which features an on-demand service more in line with its competitors, while still leveraging its existing recommendation engine and manual curation. In October 2017, Microsoft announced the discontinuation of Groove Music Pass, and directed its users to Spotify.

In 2018, YouTube Red rebranded as YouTube Premium, and YouTube concurrently introduced a redesigned YouTube Music platform, along with a separate YouTube Music subscription at a lower price point. The YouTube Music platform can be used without a subscription, but carries video advertising, and does not support background playback on mobile devices. The YouTube Music service eventually replaced Google Play Music entirely in 2020, and Google no longer operates a digital music store. 

To increase the diversity and value of their services, music streaming services have sometimes produced or acquired other forms of music-related content besides songs, including music documentaries and concert presentations. Spotify had begun to increasingly make investments into podcasts, buoyed by acquisitions such as sports publication The Ringer and exclusive rights to The Joe Rogan Experience.

Impact 
By 2013, on-demand music streaming had begun to displace online music stores as the main revenue stream of digital music. In March 2022, the International Federation of the Phonographic Industry (IFPI) reported that global wholesale revenue in the music industry had increased by US$4 billion year-over-year (YoY) in 2021—its largest increase in the past 20 years—with paid music streaming services accounting for $12.3 billion in revenue ($2.2 billion YoY), and ad-supported streaming $4.6 billion ($1.1 billion YoY). Revenue from music streaming services had more than doubled since 2017, and the estimated number of users of paid services exceeded 523 million. Music streaming services have faced criticism over the amount of royalties they distribute, including accusations that they do not fairly compensate musicians and songwriters.

Billboard introduced a Streaming Songs chart in January 2013, which would be based on the viewership of videos containing songs on platforms such as YouTube, and streams on platforms such as Spotify. In 2014, the UK Singles Chart similarly changed its methodology to include streaming. To account for digital streaming and the decline of album purchases, charts began to adopt a metric known as "album-equivalent units" (AEUs), which are based on purchases of the album, and how many times individual songs from the album have been purchased or streamed. In 2016, the German charts made a similar change, with metrics based on revenue (thus only paid streaming services count towards it).

See also 

 Comparison of music streaming services
 Digital distribution
 Video on demand

References 

Music streaming services
Recorded music